Degradation may refer to:

Science
 Degradation (geology), lowering of a fluvial surface by erosion
 Degradation (telecommunications), of an electronic signal
 Biodegradation of organic substances by living organisms
 Environmental degradation in ecology
 Land degradation, a process in which the value of the biophysical environment is affected by a combination of human-induced processes acting upon the land
 Polymer degradation, as plastics age

Other
 Elegant degradation, gradual rather than sudden
  Graceful degradation, in a fault-tolerant system
 Degradation (knighthood), revocation of knighthood
 Cashiering, whereby a military officer is dismissed for misconduct
 Reduction in rank, whereby a military officer is reduced to a lower rank for misconduct
 Degradation, the former ceremony of defrocking a disgraced priest
 Degradation, a song by the Violent Femmes, from Add It Up (1981–1993)

See also
 Dégradé, 2015 Palestinian film